Rūrangi is a 2020 New Zealand LGBT-related independent drama film directed by Max Currie. The queer and trans-positive drama was written by Cole Meyers and Oliver Page. It stars Elz Carrad in his feature film debut, along with Arlo Green, Kirk Torrance, Awhina-Rose Ashby, Aroha Rawson, Renee Sheridan and Ramon Te Wake. The film had its world premiere at the New Zealand International Film Festival on 26 July 2020. It was screened at the Frameline Film Festival in San Francisco, where it won an Audience Award for Best Narrative Feature, and was released to New Zealand theatres on 4 February 2021. All of the trans characters in the film are portrayed by trans actors. The project was initially released as a five-part web series, which was edited into a feature film for international release.

Synopsis
Caz Davis left his home in the small town of Rūrangi, abandoning everyone, and moved to Auckland to start his new life where he transitions. Years later, he returns to the town where he grew up for the first time as an out trans man. He now must face the people whom he abandoned and start to rebuild those relationships. His father is upset with him for missing his mother's funeral, and is also trying to process his transition from being his daughter to now being a trans man. Anahera, his best friend growing up, who is now trying to re-connect with her Māori heritage, is also confused and hurt by his sudden decision to leave without saying good-bye. When he finally faces his ex-boyfriend Jem, who had already made life plans for the two of them to be together, he must explain his reasons for leaving him behind. Meanwhile, Jem is questioning his uncertain feelings, because he is still attracted to Caz, but unsure if it's old feelings coming to the surface, or whether he is now attracted to Caz's masculinity.

Cast
 Elz Carrad as Caz Davis
 Arlo Green as Jem
 Kirk Torrance as Gerald Davis
 Awhina-Rose Ashby as Anahera
 Aroha Rawson as Whina Rangi
 Renee Sheridan as Agnes
 Ramon Te Wake as Ellie
 Sonny Tupu as Andrew Ainofo
 Adam Rohe as Jamie
 Tai Berdinner-Blades as Sasha Ainofo
 Adam Brown as Curt 
 Mustaq Missouri as Councillor Ron
 Kate McGill as Ria
 Nikki Si'ulepa as Hui MC
 Ross Harper as Harry
 Renee Lyons as Colleen Richter

Production notes
The project was initially planned to be a five-part web series, but was later edited together into a feature film. Fifty nine per cent of the cast and crew on the production are non-binary, and all trans characters are played by trans actors. The producers and director consulted with an advisory panel of trans people from the trans community for the film, who also had veto power over the production. Taika Waititi's sister Tweedie was also brought in as a consultant on the film to help develop the Māori storylines to ensure an accurate and authentic representation. In an interview with Marten Rabarts of the New Zealand International Film Festival, lead actor Elz Carrad revealed that he had never met another transgender person before he took on the role of Caz in the film. The movie was filmed on location in Auckland and Taranaki.

Writer Cole Meyers, who is gender diverse, said that the majority of what you see portrayed in the media in relation to transgender people is "filtered through or created by cis people’s understandings of our lives" which results in a biased view of "always seeing ourselves through other people's eyes". So they set out to create a film that was 'by us and about us', and that meant making sure the audience got to see trans-positive experiences in the film, and show that they have love for themselves, along with affection from friends, family and the community. Meyers also said they created a paid internship program for the film, funded by the New Zealand Film Commission, that partnered trans-interns with the heads of departments, to help develop a future generation of gender diverse professionals in the film industry.

In an interview with GQ Australia, director Max Currie said he was sort of apprehensive about signing on with the project, because of the condition that all trans characters be played by trans actors. He was concerned that they wouldn't be able to fill all the designated trans roles with actors who had a lot of film experience. When Elz Carrad, who had no prior experience in theatre, TV or film, sent in an audition tape, Currie said he was "extraordinary", and not only was he trans, but also Māori. After seeing Carrad's audition, Currie said he realised that this production was going to be "something really special", and went on to say that it's "really important that those characters are owned and created by people who have that life experience". As for his own involvement in the film, Currie said the producers tried to find a trans director, but couldn't due to a lack of experience, so they settled on a "salty old homosexual".

Both director Max Currie and lead actor Elz Carrad appeared in the first season of RuPaul's Drag Race Down Under, Carrad as a guest judge and Currie as a member of the show's Pit Crew.

Release
The film premiered worldwide at the New Zealand International Film Festival on 26 July 2020. It was later screened in September 2020 at the Frameline Film Festival in San Francisco, where it won an Audience Award for Best Narrative Feature. It also had additional screenings at the BFI Flare: London LGBTIQ+ Film Festival, the Melbourne Queer Film Festival and the Mardi Gras Film Festival.

It was released to New Zealand theatres on 4 February 2021, with an opening weekend gross of $2,822, and had a total international gross of $11,624. Hulu picked up the TV broadcast rights for the series while it was still playing in theatres, and there is a second season already in development.

Critical reception
Chad Armstrong wrote in The Queer Review that one of the films "great strengths is its no-nonsense, antipodean humour". Overall he found it "enjoyable and well-rounded", and gave the film . Film critic Amelia Berry said the film had "a stunning debut performance from Elz Carrad", and the movie "communicates trans experiences like no other before it". Alex Heeney said it is a film that "is all in the character details, and is filled with so many beautiful, lived in performances" and it is definitely an "emotionally satisfying and cathartic experience".

into:screens said the film offers "genuine representation of Aotearoa’s transgender community in both performative and production roles", and that is a "momentous victory". They also praised trans advocate and co-writer Cole Meyers, for doing an "incredible job at creating a heartwarming, realistic narrative that celebrates the trans community, Māori culture...and friendships that transcend gender and sexuality". They rated it a full five stars. Alistair Ryder writing in View of the Arts said it will "prove enlightening for cis viewers, but the film isn’t directly aimed at them, it’s an authentic account of a specific trans experience that is rarely dramatised in this way...and is a slow-burning character study that reveals itself to be insightful and charming in equal measure".

Graeme Tuckett from Stuff wrote "the performances and writing are universally strong, the camera work, sound and especially the editing are excellent and the storytelling is clear and sharp". Sara Clements of Awards Watch praised the film saying it is a "nuanced look at identity through a trans lens...it looks at the positive aspects of trans lives, not solely making their struggles the focus". Clement said Carrad's performance is "incredible and authentic, a true breakout star" and ended the review by concluding that when a film of this nature is told through the perspective of those who have actually lived through these experiences, "it proves how moving and powerful these kinds of films can be if they are told by the right people". American review aggregator Rotten Tomatoes has  favorable rating for the film based on film critics reviews.

See also
 LGBT in New Zealand
 List of LGBT-related films of 2020
 Transgender in film and television
 Transgender rights in New Zealand

References

External links

Rurangi at Rotten Tomatoes
Rūrangi  at BFI Flare

2020 films
2020s New Zealand films
2020 LGBT-related films
Māori-language films
New Zealand drama films
New Zealand LGBT-related films
Fictional Māori people
Films about trans men
Films about trans women
Films set in New Zealand
Films shot in New Zealand
Non-binary gender
LGBT-related drama films
Transgender-related films
Films directed by Max Currie
2020s English-language films